As a result of the Fifth Periodical Review of the Boundary Commission for Scotland, Scotland is covered by 59 constituencies of the House of Commons of the United Kingdom Parliament - 19 Burgh constituencies and 40 County constituencies. Constituencies marked * appear on the Central Area Enlargement.

Constituencies and council areas 

The Fifth Review of the Boundary Commission for Scotland related the boundaries of new constituencies to those of Scottish local government council areas and to local government wards. Apart from a few minor adjustments, the council area boundaries dated from 1996 and the ward boundaries dated from 1999. Some council areas were grouped to form larger areas and, within these larger areas, some constituencies straddle council area boundaries.

The same council area and ward boundaries were in use when the new constituencies were first used in 2005, but ward boundaries have changed since then. New wards were introduced for the 2007 Scottish local government elections.

Current MPs

The aggregate votes of all Scottish constituencies for the 2019 general election are as follows:

List of constituencies by party

Proposed boundary changes 
See 2023 Periodic Review of Westminster constituencies for further details.

Background 
The Boundary Commission for Scotland submitted their final proposals in respect of the Sixth Periodic Review of Westminster Constituencies (the 2018 review) in September 2018. Although the proposals were immediately laid before Parliament they were not brought forward by the Government for approval. Accordingly, they did not come into effect for the 2019 election which took place on 12 December 2019, and which was contested using the constituency boundaries in place since 2010.

Under the terms of the Parliamentary Voting System and Constituencies Act 2011, the Sixth Review was based on reducing the total number of MPs from 650 to 600 and a strict electoral parity requirement that the electorate of all constituencies should be within a range of 5% either side of the electoral quota.

On 24 March 2020, the Minister of State for the Cabinet Office, Chloe Smith, issued a written statement to Parliament setting out the Government's thinking with regard to parliamentary boundaries. Subsequently, the Parliamentary Constituencies Act 2020 ("the Act") was passed into law on 14 December 2020. This formally removed the duty to implement the 2018 review and set out the framework for future boundary reviews. The Act provided that the number of constituencies should remain at the current level of 650, rather than being reduced to 600, while retaining the requirement that the electorate should be no more than +/- 5% from the electoral quota.

Process 
The Act specified that the next review should be completed no later than 1 July 2023 and the Boundary Commission formally launched the 2023 Review on 5 January 2021. In accordance with the provisions of the Act, the number of constituencies allocated to Scotland will decrease by 2, from 59 to 57. This includes the protected constituencies of Na h-Eileanan an Iar and Orkney and Shetland.

As part of public consultations for the ongoing 2023 review of Westminster constituency boundaries, the Boundary Commission for Scotland released its initial proposals on 14 October 2021. Following two periods of public consultation, revised proposals were published on 8 November 2022. Final proposals will be published by 1 July 2023.

Proposed seats 
Under the revised proposals the following constituencies for Scotland would come into effect at the next general election:

Results history 
Primary data source: House of Commons research briefing - General election results from 1918 to 2019

Percentage votes 

Key:

CON - Conservative Party, including the National Liberal Party up to 1966 and the Unionist Party up to 1964

LAB - Labour Party

LIB - Liberal Party up to 1979; SDP-Liberal Alliance 1983 & 1987; Liberal Democrats from 1992

SNP - Scottish National Party

Other - includes Scottish Green Party, UK Independence Party and Brexit Party (2019)

Seats 

CON - Conservative Party, including the National Liberal Party up to 1966 and the Unionist Party up to 1964

LAB - Labour Party (2001 & 2005 - includes the Speaker, Michael Martin)

LIB - Liberal Party up to 1979; SDP-Liberal Alliance 1983 & 1987; Liberal Democrats from 1992

OTH - 1945 -  Independent Labour Party (3); Communist Party (1); Independent Unionist (John Mackie) (1); 1959 - Independent Unionist (David Robertson)

SNP - Scottish National Party

See also 
 List of Great Britain and UK Parliament constituencies in Scotland from 1707 for graphical representation by party
 Scottish Parliament constituencies and regions for seats in the Scottish Parliament
 Scottish Westminster constituencies 1918 to 1950

Footnotes

References

 2005
2005 establishments in Scotland